Sir Jacob Astley, 1st Baronet (ca. 163917 August 1729) of Melton Constable Hall, Norfolk was an English Tory politician and baronet.

Background
He was the oldest son of Edward Astley and his wife Elizabeth Astley, daughter of his uncle Jacob Astley, 1st Baron Astley of Reading. Astley was educated first at Norwich School, then King's College, Cambridge, and finally Christ Church, Oxford, where he matriculated on 19 June 1659. On 7 September of the same year on the death of his paternal uncle Sir Isaac Astley, 1st Baronet, he inherited the estates of Hill Morton, Warwickshire and Melton Constable, and in 1688 the Maidstone, Kent estates of his cousin Jacob Astley, 3rd Baron Astley of Reading. In 1664 he commenced the building of the present Melton Constable Hall. He sold the Kent estate in 1720.

Career
Having been already knighted, Astley was created a Baronet, of Hill Morton, in the County of Warwick on 26 June 1660. He was appointed High Sheriff of Norfolk for 1664 before entering the British House of Commons in 1685 as MP for Norfolk until 1689. He represented the constituency again from 1690 to 1701, from 1702 to 1705 and a last time from 1710 to 1722. Astley was High Sheriff of Norfolk in 1664 and Commissioner of Trade between 1714 and 1717.

Family
On 6 February 1661, he married Blanche Wodehouse, eldest daughter of Sir Philip Wodehouse, 3rd Baronet. They had four sons and a daughter. Astley was buried at Melton Constable few days after his death. He was succeeded in the baronetcy by his second and oldest surviving son Philip. MP Philip Metcalfe was his great-grandson.

References

Bibliography

External links 
 History of Parliament: Sir Jacob Astley 

1630s births
1729 deaths
People from North Norfolk (district)
People educated at Norwich School
Alumni of King's College, Cambridge
Alumni of Christ Church, Oxford
Baronets in the Baronetage of England
British MPs 1710–1713
British MPs 1713–1715
British MPs 1715–1722
High Sheriffs of Norfolk
Members of the Parliament of England for Norfolk
Members of the Parliament of Great Britain for Norfolk
English MPs 1685–1687
English MPs 1690–1695
English MPs 1695–1698
English MPs 1698–1700
English MPs 1701
English MPs 1702–1705
People from Rugby, Warwickshire